Koloman von Pataky, real name Kálmán Pataky de Déstalva (14 November 1896 – 3 March 1964) was a Hungarian opera singer (tenor).

Life and career 
Pataky was born in Unter-Limbach, Austria-Hungary. After a short period of training he made his debut in Budapest as the Duke of Mantua. In 1926 he went to Vienna and took part in the first performance of Die ägyptische Helena by Richard Strauss. His focus was on Italian and French music, and he made a name for himself as a Mozart singer. In 1931 he made his debut at the Salzburg Festival in Der Rosenkavalier.

In 1939, Pataky sang the role of Huon in Oberon in Milan Teatro alla Scala under Tullio Serafin.

His Mozart interpretations are said to have been among the best of the 20th century. After a leg amputation he had to end his career in the 1940s.

Filmography 
 1943: Egér a palotában.

Bibliography 
 Jürgen Kesting: Die großen Sänger des 20. Jahrhunderts. CormoranVerlag, 1993, 
 Christian Fastl: Pataky de Désfalva, Kálmán (Koloman von). Online-Ausgabe, Vienna 2002, ; Druckausgabe: volume 4, Verlag der Österreichischen Akademie der Wissenschaften, Vienna 2005, .

References

External links 
 
 
 Koloman von Pataky in: Österreichischer Bibliothekenverbund
 

1896 births
1964 deaths
People from Lendava
Hungarian operatic tenors
20th-century Hungarian male opera singers